Burdell Island (or Mira Monte) is a former island in the Petaluma River, upstream of San Pablo Bay (an embayment of San Francisco Bay). While it was previously surrounded by water and swampland, it is now surrounded mostly by dry land (although it remains much higher than surrounding land). It is part of Marin County, California. It appears in a 1954 USGS map of the region.

References

Islands of Marin County, California
Islands of Northern California
Petaluma River
San Pablo Bay